AD 46 (XLVI) was a common year starting on Saturday  of the Julian calendar. At the time, it was known as the Year of the Consulship of Asiaticus and Silanus (or, less frequently, year 799 Ab urbe condita). The denomination AD 46 for this year has been used since the early medieval period, when the Anno Domini calendar era became the prevalent method in Europe for naming years.

Events

By place

Roman Empire 
 The settlement at Celje gets municipal rights, and is named municipium Claudia Celeia.
 Dobruja is annexed into Roman Moesia.
 A census shows that there are more than 6,000,000 Roman citizens. 
 After the death of its king, Thracia becomes a Roman province.
 Rome and its northeast border are reunited by the Danube Road.

Central Asia 
 A drought and an invasion of locusts hit the Mongolian steppes, causing a famine and a revolt at Xiongnu.

Births 
 Plutarch, Greek historian and biographer (approximate date)

Deaths 
 Marcus Vinicius, Roman consul and governor (b. c. 5 BC)
 Rhoemetalces III, Roman client king of Thrace (murdered)
 Servius Asinius Celer, Roman politician (executed)

References 

0046

als:40er#46